The Wellesley Hills Branch Library is a historic library building at 210 Washington Street in Wellesley, Massachusetts.  The stone building was designed in 1927 by Hampton F. Shirer, whose plans were developed from the sketches of the late Ralph H. Hannaford, and completed in 1928.  The Colonial Revival building is L-shaped, with single story above a raised basement.  It is faced in local fieldstone.  The main block has a five-bay side-gable configuration with a projecting entry pavilion.  It is the town's first purpose-built branch library.

The building was listed on the National Register of Historic Places in 2007.

See also
National Register of Historic Places listings in Norfolk County, Massachusetts

References

External links
 Wellesley Free Library

Library buildings completed in 1927
Libraries on the National Register of Historic Places in Massachusetts
Wellesley, Massachusetts
Libraries in Norfolk County, Massachusetts
National Register of Historic Places in Norfolk County, Massachusetts